Cartignano is a comune (municipality) in the Province of Cuneo in the Italian region Piedmont, located about  southwest of Turin and about  northwest of Cuneo.

Cartignano borders the following municipalities: Dronero, Melle, Roccabruna, and San Damiano Macra.

References

Cities and towns in Piedmont